Major General William Clive Justice   (16 April 1835 - 19 November 1908) was a British Army officer.

Life

Having served the 75th Regiment of Foot, he was the Assistant Adjutant and Quartermaster of the West Indies and Officer Commanding the British Troops in Ceylon from 1893 to 1897.

References

1835 births
1908 deaths
British Army major generals
Companions of the Order of St Michael and St George
Gordon Highlanders officers
General Officers Commanding, Ceylon
Official members of the Legislative Council of Ceylon